Brasil is the fourth album by crossover thrash band Ratos de Porão, which was released in 1989 through Roadrunner Records. Considered by many fans the masterpiece of Ratos' discography, this record was the passport to the world scene. It was recorded in Berlin, and produced by Harris Johns, who produced bands such Tankard and Exumer. This can be considered as a true crossover album, mixing hardcore and metal. Available in Portuguese and English versions.

Track listing

Personnel 
 Vocals - João Gordo
 Guitars - Jão
 Bass - Jabá
 Drums - Spaghetti
 Backing vocals - David Pollack, Archi(Happy Hour) and Frank Preece (Exumer)

References

1989 debut albums
Ratos de Porão albums
Roadrunner Records albums